Battle of Saumur may refer to:
 Battle of Saumur (1793)
 Battle of Saumur (1940)